Frida Hole is a small bay lying  southeast of Coal Harbour, along the south coast and near the west end of South Georgia. It was probably named by early whalers or sealers who used the bay as an anchorage.

References

Bays of South Georgia